The 2016 Campeonato Mineiro was the 102nd season of Mineiro's top professional football league. The competition began on January 31 and will end in May.

Teams

América
Atlético Mineiro
Boa Esporte
Caldense
Cruzeiro
Guarani
Tombense
Tricordiano
Tupi
Uberlândia
URT
Villa Nova

First stage

Knockout stage

References

Campeonato Mineiro seasons
Mineiro